During its history, a number of Canadian families have produced multiple politicians. As there are no term limits in Canada for any legislative or executive office, these families have sometimes held uninterrupted political power.

Families
Amery
(father, son)
 Moe Amery, Alberta PC MLA for Calgary-East
 Mickey Amery, UCP MLA for Calgary-Cross

Ashton
(father, daughter)
 Steve Ashton, Manitoba NDP cabinet minister for Thompson
 Niki Ashton, NDP MP for Churchill—Keewatinook Aski

Bédard
 Marc-André Bédard, Vice-Premier of Quebec and Quebec Minister of Justice
 Stéphane Bédard, leader of the opposition in the National Assembly of Quebec and interim leader of the Parti Québécois
 Éric Bédard, adjunct-director for the cabinet of Quebec Premier Jacques Parizeau and counsellor for the Parti Québécois led by Pauline Marois (not to be confused with Éric Bédard (historian))

Bennett
(3rd cousins once removed, son)

R. B. Bennett, eleventh prime minister of Canada
W. A. C. Bennett, Premier of British Columbia, 1952–1972
William R. Bennett, Premier of British Columbia, 1975–1986
Brad Bennett, Chair of BC Hydro 2015–present

Bernier
(father, son)

Gilles Bernier, Quebec Progressive Conservative then Independent MP
Maxime Bernier, Quebec Conservative MP and cabinet minister then People's Party of Canada founder and leader

Blaikie
(father, daughter, son)

Bill Blaikie, Manitoba NDP MP, MLA, and provincial cabinet minister
Rebecca Blaikie, President of the federal NDP
Daniel Blaikie, Manitoba NDP MP

Braden
(brothers)

George Braden, 2nd Premier of the Northwest Territories
Bill Braden, MLA, Northwest Territories

Cannon–Power
(GGG-grandfather, G-grandfather, granduncles, grandfathers, uncles, son)

John Cannon, member of the Legislative Assembly of Lower Canada
William Power, member of the House of Commons
Joseph Ignatius Power, member of the Quebec Legislative Assembly
William Gerard Power, member of the Quebec Legislative Council
Lawrence Arthur Dumoulin Cannon, member of the Legislative Assembly of Quebec and Supreme Court Justice
Charles Gavan Power, federal cabinet minister (Minister of Pensions and National Health, Postmaster General), Senator
Lucien Cannon, federal cabinet minister (Solicitor General)
Francis Gavan Power, member of the House of Commons
Charles-Arthur Dumoulin Cannon, member of the House of Commons
Lawrence Cannon, provincial cabinet minister (Parliamentary Secretaries to the Ministers of Foreign Trade and Technological Development, Tourism; Minister for Communications) and federal cabinet minister (Foreign Minister, Minister of Transport)
Philippe Cannon, chief of staff in two ministries of Quebec

Caouette

(father, son)

Réal Caouette, MP for Pontiac (1946–1949), MP for Villeneuve (1962–1968,) Leader of the Ralliement créditiste (1963–1971), MP for Témiscamingue (1968–1976), Leader of the Social Credit Party (1971–1976)
Gilles Caouette, MP for Charlevoix (1972–1974), MP for Témiscamingue (1976–1979), Acting Leader of the Social Credit Party (1976)

Caplan
(mother, son)

Elinor Caplan, Liberal MPP and provincial cabinet (Health, Management Board), Liberal MP and federal cabinet minister (as Minister of Citizenship and Immigration, National Revenue)
David Caplan, Liberal MPP and provincial minister (Health, Infrastructure)

Carr
(two twin brothers and their older brother)

Jack Carr, MLA, New Brunswick
Jody Carr, MLA, New Brunswick
Jeff Carr, MLA, New Brunswick

Casgrain-Beaubien
Charles-Eusèbe Casgrain Sr, MLA Lower Canada
Philippe Baby Casgrain MNA, son of Charles-Eusèbe
Charles Eusèbe Casgrain, Senator for Ontario, son of Charles-Eusèbe
Thomas Chase Casgrain MNA, MP, son of Charles Eusèbe
Léon Casgrain (1892–1967), Quebec MLA, great-grandson of Charles-Eusèbe
Pierre Beaubien, MLA Canada East, president of SSJBM, municipal politician in Montreal
Joseph-Octave Beaubien (nephew), MLA Canada East, MP
Louis Beaubien, MNA, president of SSJBM, co-founder of Outremont
Charles-Philippe Beaubien (son of Louis), senator
Louis-Philippe Beaubien (grandson of Louis), senator
(many more, see :fr:Famille Casgrain)

Chiarelli
(cousins)

Bob Chiarelli, mayor of Ottawa, Regional Chair of Ottawa-Carleton, provincial MPP and cabinet minister (Ministers of Energy, Municipal Affairs and Housing, Transportation, Energy and Infrastructure)
Rick Chiarelli, city councillor in Ottawa
John Chiarelli, former Catholic school board trustee in Ottawa

Chartrand

Michel Chartrand, president of CSN union federation, founder of Parti Socialiste du Québec
Simonne Monet-Chartrand (wife of Michel), founder of Fédération des femmes du Québec

Chrétien–Desmarais
(father-nephew-daughter)

Jean Chrétien, prime minister
Raymond Chrétien, Ambassador to the USA
France Chrétien Desmarais, husband advisor to Hong Kong Special Administrative Region (China) international advisors council

Clement
(stepfather-stepson)

John Clement, Ontario cabinet minister
Tony Clement, Ontario cabinet minister, federal cabinet minister

Copps
(father-daughter)

Victor K. Copps, mayor of Hamilton, Ontario
Sheila Copps, federal cabinet minister

Crosbie
(grandfather, father, son)

Sir John Chalker Crosbie, cabinet minister in pre-Confederation Newfoundland
Chesley Crosbie, politician and anti-Confederation campaigner
John Crosbie, federal cabinet minister
Ches Crosbie, MHA, Leader of the Newfoundland and Labrador Progressive Conservative Party and Leader of the Opposition

David
(great-grandfather, grandfather, father, sisters)

Laurent-Olivier David, MNA Montréal-Est, senator Mille-Isles, founder of newspapers, journalist, historian
Athanase David, federal cabinet minister, senator
Paul David, senator 
Françoise David, co-speaker of Québec Solidaire, MNA for Gouin
Hélène David, Quebec minister of Culture and communications, Liberal MNA for Outremont

Davie Fulton
(2 brothers, son-in-law, grandson)

Theodore Davie, Premier of British Columbia, 1878–1879
Alexander Edmund Batson Davie, Premier of British Columbia 1892–1895 (brother of Theodore Davie)
Frederick John Fulton, Unionist Member of Parliament for Cariboo, 1917 (father of Davie Fulton)
Davie Fulton, Member of Parliament Progressive Conservative and British Columbia Conservative Leader (grandson of Premier Davie)

De Lorimier

Claude-Nicolas-Guillaume de Lorimier Jr, MLA Lower Canada
François-Marie-Thomas Chevalier de Lorimier (grandson of brother), notary, Parti patriote activist, captain of patriot army, executed at Pied-du-Courant Prison

De Lotbinière

Michel-Eustache-Gaspard-Alain Chartier de Lotbinière, MLA Lower Canada (Speaker in 1794-1797)
Antoine Chartier de Lotbinière Harwood (grandson of Michel), MLA Canada-East, MNA
Henri-Gustave Joly de Lotbinière (grandson of Michel), MLA Canada-East, MNA, Premier of Quebec (1878–1879), MP, federal minister

Dewar
(mother-son)

Marion Dewar, mayor of Ottawa and New Democratic Party (NDP) Member of Parliament
Paul Dewar, NDP Member of Parliament

Dorion

Pierre-Antoine Dorion, MLA Lower Canada
Jean-Baptiste-Éric Dorion, MLA Canada East, co-founder of Institut canadien de Montréal
Antoine-Aimé Dorion, MLA Canada East, Premier Canada East 1858–1858 & 1863–1864
Vincislas-Paul-Wilfrid Dorion, lawyer, journalist, politician, judge

Douglas
(father, daughter)

Tommy Douglas, Co-operative Commonwealth Federation (CCF) and then founder of the New Democratic Party (NDP), member of Canadian House of Commons (CCF), MLA, leader of the Saskatchewan CCF and Premier of Saskatchewan (CCF), set up North America's first single-payer, universal healthcare program (Saskatchewan), leader of federal NDP, Canadian Member of Parliament (NDP)
Shirley Douglas (daughter of Tommy Douglas), Canadian actress and activist, ex-wife of actor Donald Sutherland, mother of Thomas Emil Sicks, actor Kiefer Sutherland, and film and television producer Rachel Sutherland

Duceppe
(grandfather, father, son)

Jean Duceppe, actor, radio personality, president of Union des artistes
Gilles Duceppe, first MP elected as Bloc Québécois, leader of Bloc Québécois, 24th federal Leader of Opposition
Alexis Brunelle-Duceppe, Bloc Québécois MP for Lac-Saint-Jean
Eyking
(husband, wife)

Mark Eyking, Liberal MP
Pam Eyking, Liberal MLA

Ferron

J.-Émile Ferron, MP (PLC), lawyer
Jacques Ferron (son of J.-Émile), founder of the Rhinoceros Party of Canada (1963–93), physician, writer
Madeleine Ferron (daughter of J.-Émile), wife of politician/judge Robert Cliche

Flaherty-Elliott
(husband, wife)

Jim Flaherty, late provincial and federal cabinet minister
Christine Elliott, PC MPP

Ford
Doug Ford, Sr., former PC MPP (1995–1999)
Rob Ford, 64th Mayor of Toronto, Toronto City Councillor; son of Doug
Doug Ford, Jr., 26th Premier of Ontario, Toronto City Councillor; son of Doug
Michael Ford (politician), Toronto City Councillor; nephew of Rob and Doug Jr
Additionally, Rob Ford's widow Renata Ford was People's Party candidate in the 2019 federal election in Etobicoke North, and Doug Ford, Jr.'s daughter Krista Haynes advocates controversial positions about vaccines and public health measures.

Gérin-Lajoie (see also Lacoste)
Antoine Gérin-Lajoie, writer, lawyer, author of the political song "Un Canadien errant"
Marie Lacoste-Gérin-Lajoie, promoter of women's rights, got Quebec's Code Civil modified
Marie Gérin-Lajoie (daughter of Marie L & Henri/Henry), founder of Notre-Dame-du-Bon-Conseil institute and of FNSJB (feminist organisation)
Paul Gérin-Lajoie, MNA, founder of the Ministry of Education of Quebec; see also Gérin-Lajoie doctrine (international policy)

Gerretsen
(father, son)

John Gerretsen, 90th Mayor of Kingston, Ontario (1980–1988), Ontario Liberal MPP for Kingston and the Islands (1995–2014)
Mark Gerretsen, Mayor of Kingston Ontario (2010–2014), Liberal MP for Kingston and the Islands (2015-)

Ghiz

(father, son)

Joe Ghiz, Premier of Prince Edward Island (1986–1993)
Robert Ghiz, Premier of Prince Edward Island (2007–2015)

Grewal
(husband, wife)

Gurmant Grewal and Nina Grewal, Conservative Members of Parliament, the first married couple to serve as MPs in the same session of Parliament

Hampton–Martel
(husband-wife, wife's father and maternal grandfather)

Norman Fawcett, New Democrat MP
Elie Martel, Ontario New Democrat MPP (married Fawcett's daughter)
Shelley Martel, Ontario New Democrat MPP
Howard Hampton, Ontario New Democrat leader, 1996–2009

Harris
(father, son)

 Mike Harris, Progressive Conservative premier of Ontario (1995–2002)
 Mike Harris Jr., Ontario Progressive Conservative MPP for Kitchener—Conestoga

Henderson
(father, son)

George Henderson, federal MP (1980–1988)
Robert Henderson, PEI provincial MLA (2007–present)

Hinman
(grandfather, grandson)

Edgar Hinman, Provincial Treasurer, Alberta
Paul Hinman, leader of the Alberta Alliance Party

Horner

Ralph Horner, patriarch for the Horner family, Senator (1933–1964)
Samuel Norval Horner, brother, Saskatchewan MLA (1929–1934)
Jack Horner, son, MP (1958–1959)
Nate Horner, grandson, MLA (2019–present)
Hugh Horner, son, MP (1958–1967)
Norval Horner, son, MP (1972–1974)
Norval Horner, son to Norval Horner, Alberta Liberal Party candidate in the 2012 election
Albert Horner, nephew, MP (1958–1968)
Doug Horner, son of Alberta Horner, Alberta MLA and Cabinet Minister (2001–2015)
Byron Horner, grandson, Conservative candidate for Courtenay-Alberni in the 2019 federal election

Ignatieff
(great-grandfather, grandfather, father, son)

Count Nikolai Pavlovich Ignatiev, Minister of the Interior (Russia)
Count Paul Ignatieff, Minister of Education (Russia)
George Ignatieff, ambassador/president of UN security council (1968–1969)
Michael Ignatieff, federal Member of Parliament and leader of the Liberal Party of Canada (2008–2011)

Jackman
(grandfather, son-in-law, son-in-law's children)

Newton Rowell, Ontario Liberal Party leader
Harry Jackman, Member of Parliament (married Rowell's daughter)
Hal Jackman, Lieutenant Governor of Ontario
Nancy Ruth, Senator

Johnson
(father-sons)

Daniel Johnson, Sr., Union Nationale Premier of Quebec 1966–1968
Pierre-Marc Johnson, Parti Québécois Premier of Quebec, 1985; son of Daniel, Sr.
Daniel Johnson, Jr., Liberal Party of Quebec Premier of Quebec, 1994; son of Daniel, Sr.; brother of Pierre-Marc

Kelley
(father-son, wife)

Geoffrey Kelley, Quebec Liberal Party MNA for Jacques-Cartier 1994–2018
Greg Kelley, Quebec Liberal Party MNA for Jacques-Cartier 2018–present; son of Geoffrey
Marwah Rizqy, Quebec Liberal Party MNA for Saint-Laurent 2018–present; wife of Greg, daughter-in-law of Geoffrey

Lacoste

Alexandre Lacoste, president of senate
Marie Lacoste-Gérin-Lajoie (daughter of Alexandre) (see Gérin-Lajoie)
Justine Lacoste-Beaubien (daughter of Alexandre), co-founder & director of Hôpital Sainte-Justine

Lamoureux
(father, daughter)
 Kevin Lamoureux, federal Liberal Member of Parliament for Winnipeg North
 Cindy Lamoureux, Manitoba Liberal MLA

Layton
(grandfather, father, son, wife)

Gilbert Layton, Member of the National Assembly of Quebec and cabinet minister
Robert Layton, federal Member of Parliament and cabinet minister
Jack Layton, Toronto City Councillor and leader of the federal New Democratic Party
Olivia Chow, Toronto City Councillor and Member of Parliament
Mike Layton, Toronto City Councillor (son of Jack, stepson of Olivia)
(Jack Layton is also a descendant of William Steeves, a Father of Confederation and Senator, on his maternal side.)

Léger
(father, son, daughter)

Marcel Léger, co-founder of Léger Marketing, Member of the National Assembly of Quebec, PQ cabinet minister, founder of Parti nationaliste du Québec
Jean-Marc Léger, co-founder and current leader of Léger Marketing (one of the two main pollsters of Quebec politics)
Nicole Léger, Member of the National Assembly of Quebec, PQ cabinet minister

Lewis
(father and son)

David Lewis, leader of the New Democratic Party of Canada
Stephen Lewis, leader of the Ontario New Democratic Party, Canadian Ambassador to the United Nations

Lougheed
(grandfather and grandson)

Sir James Lougheed, Senator
Peter Lougheed, Premier of Alberta

MacKay
(father-son)

Elmer MacKay, Progressive Conservative MP and cabinet minister
Peter MacKay, Progressive Conservative and then Conservative MP and former Progressive Conservative leader

Manly
(father-son)

James Manly, BC NDP MP
Paul Manly, BC Green Party MP

Manning
(father-son)

Ernest Manning, Premier of Alberta, 1943–1968
Preston Manning, founder of the Reform Party, MP

Martin
(father-son)

Paul Martin Sr., long serving Cabinet minister
Paul Martin, 21st prime minister

Macdonald
(father-son)

John A. Macdonald, first prime minister of Canada
Hugh John Macdonald, federal cabinet minister, premier of Manitoba

Mackenzie King
(grandfather-grandson)

William Lyon Mackenzie, rebel, first mayor of Toronto
William Lyon Mackenzie King, Canada's longest serving prime minister

Mathyssen
(mother, daughter)
 Irene Mathyssen, former NDP MP for London—Fanshawe
 Lindsay Mathyssen, NDP MP for London—Fanshawe

McGuinty
(father-son)

Dalton McGuinty, Sr., MPP from Ottawa South
Dalton McGuinty, MPP from Ottawa South, and Premier of Ontario
David McGuinty, MP from Ottawa South

McLeod
(brothers)

Bob McLeod, Premier of the Northwest Territories
Michael McLeod, MLA in the Northwest Territories and Liberal MP for Northwest Territories

Meighen
(father, son, daughter, grandson, grandson's stepfather)

Arthur Meighen, ninth prime minister of Canada
Lillian Meighen, philanthropist
Theodore Meighen, lawyer and philanthropist
Michael Meighen, Senator
Hartland Molson, Senator, married Theodore Meighen's widow

Mercier-Gouin

Honoré Mercier, Premier of Quebec (1887–1891)
Honoré Mercier Jr. (son of Honoré & brother-in-law of Lomer Gouin), MNA
Honoré Mercier III, MNA
Lomer Gouin, Premier of Quebec (1905–1920)
Paul Gouin (son of Lomer & Éliza, grandson of Honoré), MNA, founder of Action Libérale Nationale party, co-founder of Bloc populaire party
Léon Mercier Gouin (son of Lomer & Éliza, grandson of Honoré), co-founder of HEC Montréal university, political writer
Ollivier Mercier Gouin (son of Léon-Mercier), writer, reporter, actor
 Louis Gouin (?), MLA Lower Canada
 Thomas Mulcair, great-great-grandson of Honoré Sr. and great-great-great-grandson of Pierre-Joseph-Olivier Chauveau, Federal Leader of Opposition for NPD, cabinet minister in Quebec

Miville-Dechêne

François-Gilbert Miville Dechêne, MLA, cabinet minister in Québec
Alphonse-Arthur Miville Déchêne, MP, senator, brother of François-Gilbert
Aimé-Miville Déchêne, MP, son of Alphonse-Arthur
Louis-Auguste Dupuis, MLA Québec, president of notaries, nephew of François-Gilbert & Alphonse-Arthur
Pamphile-Gaspard Verreault, MLA Québec, other uncle of Louis-Auguste
Jean-Baptiste Couillard Dupuis, MLA Québec, father-in-law of Pamphile-Gaspard
Joseph Miville Dechene, MP, MLA Alberta, city councillor

Mulroney
(father, daughter, son)

Brian Mulroney, 18th prime minister of Canada (1984-1993)
Caroline Mulroney, provincial Progressive Conservative Ontario Minister of Transportation and Minister of Francophone Affairs; daughter of Brian Mulroney
Ben Mulroney, Canadian television host; son of Brian Mulroney
Jessica Mulroney, Canadian fashion stylist and marketing consultant; wife of Ben Mulroney, daughter-in-law of Brian Mulroney

Nickle
(father, son)

 William Folger Nickle, MP for Kingston and namesake of the Nickle Resolution
 William McAdam Nickle, MPP for Kingston

Nixon (Alberta)
(brother, brother)

Jason Nixon, Alberta United Conservative Party MLA
Jeremy Nixon, Alberta United Conservative Party MLA

Nixon (Ontario)
(grandfather, father, daughter)

Harry Nixon, Ontario premier 
Robert Nixon, Ontario Liberal Party leader
Jane Stewart, Liberal MP, cabinet minister, chief of staff

Notley
(father, daughter)

Grant Notley, Alberta MLA, Leader of the Alberta New Democratic Party
Rachel Notley, Premier of Alberta

O'Toole
(father, son)

 John O'Toole, Ontario Progressive Conservative MPP for Durham
 Erin O'Toole, leader of the Conservative Party of Canada and leader of the Official Opposition (2020–2022), and MP for Durham

Papineau
(see also Viger)

 Joseph Papineau, MLA Lower Canada
 Louis-Joseph Papineau (#1, son of Joseph), leader of the Parti patriote
 Talbot Mercer Papineau (grandson of Louis-Joseph #1, son of Louis-Joseph #2, cousin of Henri Bourassa)
 Denis-Benjamin Papineau (son of Joseph), MLA Canada East, Premier of Canada East (1846–1848)
 Denis-Émery Papineau (son of Denis-Benjamin), MLA Canada East
 Henri Bourassa (son of Mrs Azélie Papineau), MP, MNA, founder of Ligue nationaliste, founder of Le Devoir newspaper
 Louis-Joseph Papineau (#3, son of Narcisse), MP, MNA
 François Bourassa (uncle of Henri, brother-in-law of Azélie), captain of patriote army, MLA Canada-East, MP

Parizeau

 Damase Dalpé dit Parizeau, MNA
 Télesphore Parizeau, dean of medecine at Université de Montréal
 Gérard Parizeau, insurer & historian
 Jacques Parizeau (great-grandson of Damase), Deputy Minister, MNA, Minister of Finance of Quebec, Premier of Quebec (1994–1996)
 Alice Parizeau (Alicja Poznańska) (1st wife of Jacques), writer, journalist, criminologist, Croix de Guerre (WW2 French decoration)
 Lisette Lapointe (or Lizette) (2nd wife of Jacques), MNA, mayor of Saint-Adolphe-d'Howard

Peterson
(brother, brother, brother and wife)

Jim Peterson, MP for Willowdale and Cabinet Minister
David Peterson, MPP for London Centre and Premier of Ontario
Tim Peterson, MPP for Mississauga South
Deb Matthews, MPP for London North Centre

Pouliot

Jean-Baptiste Pouliot, MP for Témiscouata, MLA Canada-East for Témiscouata
Joseph-Camille Pouliot, son of Jean-Baptiste, lawyer, judge of Superior Court of Quebec
Georges Bouchard, son-in-law of Joseph-Camille, MP for Kamouraska
Camille Pouliot (Camille-Eugène), son of Joseph-Camille, MNA for Gaspé-Sud, minister, mayor
Rodolphe Lemieux, brother of 3rd wife of Joseph-Camille, senator
Charles-Eugène Pouliot, son of Jean-Baptiste, MP for Témiscouata, MNA for Témiscouata
Jean-François Pouliot, son of Charles-Eugène, MP for Témiscouata

Rae
(father-brother-brother)

Saul Rae, career diplomat
Bob Rae, New Democratic Party of Ontario premier of Ontario, diplomat, candidate in the 2006 Liberal Party of Canada leadership election
John Rae, strategic political advisor to Liberal prime ministers

Regan-Harrison
(maternal grandfather-father-son-son's wife)

John Harrison, Saskatchewan Liberal MP
Gerald A. Regan, Liberal Party of Nova Scotia premier of Nova Scotia, federal cabinet minister
Geoff Regan, federal Liberal cabinet minister
Kelly Regan, provincial MLA

Roblin
(grandfather-grandson)

Rodmond Roblin, premier of Manitoba
Dufferin ("Duff") Roblin, premier of Manitoba, federal senator

Rowe
(father-daughter)

William Earl Rowe, Ontario Conservative Party leader and Lieutenant Governor of Ontario
Jean Casselman Wadds, Member of Parliament and diplomat

Rowe
(father-daughter)

William Earl Rowe, Ontario Conservative Party leader and Lieutenant Governor of Ontario
Jean Casselman Wadds, Member of Parliament and diplomat

Schreyer
(father-son)

Ed Schreyer, NDP Premier of Manitoba and Governor General of Canada
Jason Schreyer, Winnipeg City Councillor for Elmwood-East Kildonan
Jason Schreyer's maternal grandfather was Jacob Schulz, CCF Member of Parliament for Springfield.

Shaw–McDonough
(father-daughter)

Lloyd R. Shaw, first research director of the federal CCF, and provincial secretary of the Nova Scotia CCF
 Alexa McDonough, Member of the Legislative Assembly and leader of the Nova Scotia New Democratic Party, and Member of Parliament and leader of the federal NDP (the NDP being the CCF's successor)

Singh
(brothers)

Jagmeet Singh, former Ontario NDP MPP for Bramalea—Gore—Malton, Leader of the New Democratic Party
Gurratan Singh, Ontario NDP MPP for Brampton East

Sifton
(father-sons)

John Wright Sifton, MLA, speaker of the house in Manitoba
Arthur Sifton, premier of Alberta, federal cabinet minister
Clifford Sifton, Manitoba cabinet minister, federal cabinet minister

Simpson
(father, son)
Rocky Simpson Sr., Northwest Territories MLA for Hay River South
R. J. Simpson, Northwest Territories MLA for Hay River North

Sinclair–Trudeau
(grandfather, son-in-law, grandson)

James Sinclair, federal cabinet minister (Minister of Fisheries) and father of Margaret Trudeau
Pierre Trudeau, federal Liberal cabinet minister, 15th prime minister of Canada
Justin Trudeau, 23rd prime minister of Canada
Alexandre Trudeau, television journalist

Strahl
(father, son)
 Chuck Strahl, Former Conservative MP for Chilliwack—Fraser Canyon
 Mark Strahl, Conservative MP for Chilliwack—Hope, previously Chilliwack—Fraser Canyon

Streatch-Keddy
(father, daughter, son)
 Ken Streatch, former Conservative MP for Chilliwack—Fraser Canyon
 Steve Streatch, former Halifax Regional Municipality Councillor
 Judy Streatch, former Progressive Conservative MLA for Chester-St. Margaret's
Gerald Keddy, former Conservative MP for South Shore-St. Margaret's (married to Judy Streatch)

Stronach
(father, daughter)
 Frank Stronach, Austrian-Canadian businessman, founder of Magna International and Team Stronach
 Belinda Stronach, businesswoman and MP for Newmarket—Aurora from 2004 to 2008, crossing the floor from Conservative to Liberal in 2005

Taschereau

Gabriel-Elzéar Taschereau, MLA Lower Canada
Jean-Thomas Taschereau (1778–1832) Sr, MLA Lower Canada, judge
Elzéar-Alexandre Taschereau, first catholic cardinal born in Canada
Jean-Thomas Taschereau Jr, Quebec Superior Court
Louis-Alexandre Taschereau, Premier of Quebec 1920–1936
Robert Taschereau, chief justice of Supreme Court, interim Governor General
Thomas-Pierre-Joseph Taschereau, businessman, judge, Legislative Council of Lower Canada
Joseph-André Taschereau, lawyer, MLA Lower Canada, MLA Canada-East, judge of Superior Court of Quebec
Pierre-Elzéar Taschereau, lawyer, MLA Lower Canada, MLA Canada-East
Henri-Elzéar Taschereau, MLA Canada-East, first French-Canadian chief justice of Supreme Court, Judicial Committee of the Privy Council

Taylor
(father-children)
 Tom Taylor, mayor of Newmarket, Ontario (1997–2006)
 John Taylor, mayor of Newmarket, Ontario (2018–present)
 Leah Taylor Roy, Liberal MP for Aurora—Oak Ridges—Richmond Hill (2021–present)

Trudeau 
(father-son)
Pierre Trudeau, 15th prime minister of Canada
 Justin Trudeau, 23rd prime minister of Canada
Tupper
(father-sons)

Charles Tupper, 6th prime minister of Canada
 Charles Hibbert Tupper, Minister of Justice
 William Johnston Tupper, Lieutenant Governor of Manitoba

Vallières
Yvon Vallières, MNA, President of Assemblée Nationale
Monique Gagnon-Tremblay, MNA, Vice-Premier, wife of Yvon Vallières
Karine Vallières, MNA, daughter

Viger
(see also Papineau)

Denis Viger, MLA Lower Canada
Denis-Benjamin Viger, owner of newspapers, MLA Lower Canada, MLA Canada East, Premier of Canada East (1843–1846)
Jacques Viger (sr), MLA Lower Canada
Jacques Viger (1787–1858) (Jr), 1st mayor of Montreal
Bonaventure Viger, patriote in Lower Canada Rebellion, cousin of Denis-Benjamin
Joseph Viger, MLA Lower Canada
Louis-Michel Viger, MLA Lower Canada, MLA Canada East

Wagner
(father-son)

Claude Wagner, judge, Quebec Liberal MNA and cabinet minister and Progressive Conservative MP and Senator
Richard Wagner, judge, Chief Justice of Canada, Administrator of Canada

Whelan
(brother-father-daughter)

Edward Charles Whelan, Member of Legislative Assembly (Saskatchewan) 1960–1979, Minister of Mineral Resources 1975–1976, Minister of Consumer Affairs 1976–1979
Eugene Whelan, Member of Parliament 1962–1984, Minister of Agricultuture 1972–1979 and 1980–1984, Canadian Senate 1996–1999, Officer of the Order of Canada
Susan Whelan, Member of Parliament 1993–2004, Minister for International Cooperation

Whitehead
(grandfather-father-daughter)

Joseph Whitehead, Member of Parliament (Huron North, Ontario) 1867–1871
Dr. Joseph Donovan Ross, Member of Legislative Assembly (Alberta) 1952–1971, Minister of Health 1955–1968, Minister of Lands and Forests 1968-1971
Val Meredith, Member of Parliament (South Surrey - White Rock - Langley, British Columbia) 1993–2004

Woodsworth-MacInnis
(father-son in law-daughter)

J.S. Woodsworth, founding leader of the CCF, MP 1921–1942
Angus MacInnis, MP from BC 1930–1957, involved in founding of the CCF, husband of Grace MacInnis
Grace MacInnis, BC CCF MLA 1941–45, NDP MP 1965–1974, daughter of J.S. Woodsworth

Yakabuski
(father-son)

Paul Yakabuski, Reeve of Barry's Bay, Ontario, MPP, Renfrew South, Ontario
John Yakabuski MPP, Renfrew—Nipissing—Pembroke, Ontario

References

See also
 Political families of the world

Families
 List
Lists of political families